Allen Winnett Jacobs (May 19, 1941 – April 22, 2014) was a National Football League fullback and halfback with the Green Bay Packers and New York Giants.  He played college football at the University of Utah.

Jacobs was drafted by the Green Bay Packers in the tenth round (139th overall) of the 1964 NFL Draft.  He was a member of the 1965 NFL Champion Green Bay Packer team. He was also drafted by the AFL's Buffalo Bills in the 26th round (205th overall) of the 1964 American Football League Draft.

After his playing career ended, Jacobs served for eight seasons as the head coach of Westminster Parsons football from 1971 to 1978. During his tenure, Jacobs compiled an overall record of 31 wins and 41 losses (31–41).

Jacobs died on April 22, 2014 from a heart attack.

References

External links
 

1941 births
2014 deaths
American football fullbacks
American football halfbacks
Green Bay Packers players
New York Giants players
Utah Utes football players
Westminster Parsons football coaches
Coaches of American football from California
Players of American football from Los Angeles
Sports coaches from Los Angeles